Shwebo may refer to:

Shwebo, Bhamo,  Kachin State, Burma
Shwebo, Sagaing, Burma